Marlion Jackson (born October 11, 1975) is a former American football running back and linebacker. He  was born in Detroit, Michigan. He attended Saginaw Valley State University, where he played football for two seasons. He played for the Philadelphia Soul in the Arena Football League from 2004 to 2005. In 2005, he signed with the Las Vegas Gladiators. In 2006, Jackson played one game with the Atlanta Falcons of the NFL. Jackson returned to the Gladiators in 2008, who had since relocated to Cleveland.

Pro Wrestling Career

In 2019, Jackson started a career in professional wrestling at Rocky Mountain Pro in Golden, Colorado under the name Marlion Bishop. He debuted against The Mopboy on January 19, 2019. He is a former Rocky Mountain Pro Charged champion (2 times) as well as a former Rocky Mountain Pro Heavyweight Champion, winning the championship from Atiba Obika on October 19, 2019 

As of 2023, he continues to wrestle for various independent promotions around Colorado.

References

External links 
Marlion Jackson - ArenaFootball.com

1977 births
Living people
American football fullbacks
American football linebackers
Saginaw Valley State Cardinals football players
Frankfurt Galaxy players
Philadelphia Soul players
Atlanta Falcons players
Las Vegas Gladiators players
Cleveland Gladiators players
Players of American football from Detroit
Pittsburgh Power players
Central High School (Detroit) alumni